Tatsuki (written: 樹, 達樹, 竜樹, 立規 or 辰希) is a unisex Japanese given name. It is also a Japanese surname (written: 立木). Notable people with the name include:

Given name
Tatsuki, Japanese director for anime shows such as Kemono Friends
, better known as Don Fujii, Japanese professional wrestler
, Japanese manga artist
, Japanese footballer 
, Japanese ice hockey player
, Japanese footballer
, Japanese footballer
, Japanese former baseball player
, Japanese figure skater
, Japanese footballer
, Japanese footballer
, Japanese footballer 
, Japanese kickboxer 
, Japanese motorcycle racer
, Japanese handball player

Surname
, Japanese photographer

Fictional characters
, a character in the manga series Bleach
, a character in the manga series Hyakko
, a character in the manga series Gals!
, a character in the manga series C.M.B.
Tatsuki Oohira, a character in the manga series Hands Off!
, the alias for Kiri Minase, the main character in the manga series Never Give Up!

See also
 Tatsuki, a type of Pueblo clown figure

Japanese-language surnames
Japanese unisex given names